The women's 80 metres hurdles event at the 1955 Pan American Games was held at the Estadio Universitario in Mexico City on 16 and 17 March.

Medalists

Results

Heats

Final

References

Athletics at the 1955 Pan American Games
1955